"Manhattan from the Sky" is one of three singles from singer-songwriter Kate Voegele's second studio album, A Fine Mess. This single and the rest of her album was produced by Mike Elizondo, who has worked with Pink and Maroon 5. The song was also featured on the 18th episode from the sixth season of the series One Tree Hill.

Track listing
Digital download
 "Manhattan from the Sky" – 3:31

Charts

References

2009 singles
2009 songs
Interscope Records singles
Song recordings produced by Mike Elizondo